Paint Rock School is a public primary, intermediate and highschool located in Paint Rock, Texas (USA) and classified as a 1A school by the UIL. It is part of the Paint Rock Independent School District located in Concho County. In 2015, the school was rated "Met Standard" by the Texas Education Agency.

Athletics
The Paint Rock Indians compete in the following sports:

 Basketball
 Cross Country
 Six Man Football
 Golf
 Tennis
 Track & Field
 Volleyball

References

External links
Official Website

Public high schools in Texas
Education in Concho County, Texas